TIAS.com (The Internet Antique Shop) is an online retail marketplace for antiques and collectibles. The company was founded in 1995 and is based in Garden City, New York. The company is privately held.

Business Profile

TIAS.com inventory consists of antiques and collectibles for retail sale by member dealers. TIAS.com runs additional internet properties related to the antiques and collectibles trade including curioscape.com, antiquearts.com and collectoronline.com . The company also operates earthling.com where non-antique and collectible items may be listed by members.

Along with GoAntiques and Ruby Lane, Tias is considered one of the 3 major online antique malls.

As of July 2014, the site lists more than 490,000 items from thousands of dealers in the United States and Canada.

History
TIAS.com has been online since April 1995 and was an early provider of member inventory to eBay.

In 1996 TIAS acquired CyberAntiquemall.com. 

In 2000 TIAS acquired online antique mall, AntiqueArts.com.

In 2003 TIAS.com acquired online antique mall, CollectorOnline, from AOL.

In 2008 TIAS.com acquired 400 merchants from Architecturals.net.

In 2012 TIAS.com acquired 250 merchants from Tabletopsetc.com.

References

External links
 official site

Online retailers of the United States